Cabinet of Blagoje Nešković (also known as the People's Government of Serbia) was the first Government of the Federated State of Serbia, and the first Serbian Government after the liberation of this country from the Nazi occupation. It was formed on April 9, 1945 on a session of the People's Assembly. It was dissolved on November 22, 1946, after the Federative People's Republic of Yugoslavia was declared, and after a new Constitution was adopted. After its dissolution, a new cabinet was formed, headed by the same Prime Minister.

Due to the fact that this cabinet was formed before the declaration of the Federative People's Republic of Yugoslavia, and before the adoption of a new Constitution, the term used for a person in charge of a Government department was not a "Minister", but a "Trustee".

Cabinet members

See also
Cabinet of Serbia
People's Republic of Serbia
Communists Party of Yugoslavia
League of Communists of Serbia

References

Cabinets of Serbia
Cabinets established in 1945
Cabinets disestablished in 1946